Some Marxists posit what they deem to be Karl Marx's theory of human nature, which they accord an important place in his critique of capitalism, his conception of communism, and his 'materialist conception of history'. Marx, however, does not refer to human nature as such, but to Gattungswesen, which is generally translated as 'species-being' or 'species-essence'. According to a note from Marx in the Manuscripts of 1844, the term is derived from Ludwig Feuerbach's philosophy, in which it refers both to the nature of each human and of humanity as a whole.

However, in the sixth Theses on Feuerbach (1845), Marx criticizes the traditional conception of human nature as a species which incarnates itself in each individual, instead arguing that human nature is formed by the totality of social relations. Thus, the whole of human nature is not understood, as in classical idealist philosophy, as permanent and universal: the species-being is always determined in a specific social and historical formation, with some aspects being biological. According to David Ruccio, a transhistorical concept of "human nature" would be eschewed by Marx who wouldn't accept any transhistorical or transcultural "human nature." much in the same way as in Marxian critique of political economy.

The sixth thesis on Feuerbach and the determination of human nature by social relations
The sixth of the Theses on Feuerbach, written in 1845, provided an early discussion by Marx of the concept of human nature. It states:

Feuerbach resolves the essence of religion into the essence of man [menschliches Wesen = 'human nature']. But the essence of man is no abstraction inherent in each single individual. In reality, it is the ensemble of the social relations. Feuerbach, who does not enter upon a criticism of this real essence is hence obliged: 
1. To abstract from the historical process and to define the religious sentiment regarded by itself, and to presuppose an abstract — isolated - human individual.
2. The essence therefore can by him only be regarded as 'species', as an inner 'dumb' generality which unites many individuals only in a natural way.

Thus, Marx appears to say that human nature is no more than what is made by the "social relations". Norman Geras's Marx and Human Nature (1983), however, offers an argument against this position. In outline, Geras shows that, while the social relations are held to "determine" the nature of people, they are not the only such determinant. However, Marx makes statements where he specifically refers to a human nature which is more than what is conditioned by the circumstances of one's life. In Capital, in a footnote critiquing utilitarianism, he says that utilitarians must reckon with "human nature in general, and then with human nature as modified in each historical epoch". Marx is arguing against an abstract conception of human nature, offering instead an account rooted in sensuous life. While he is quite explicit that "[a]s individuals express their life, so they are. Hence what individuals are depends on the material conditions of their production", he also believes that human nature will condition (against the background of the productive forces and relations of production) the way in which individuals express their life. History involves "a continuous transformation of human nature", though this does not mean that every aspect of human nature is wholly variable; what is transformed need not be wholly transformed.

Marx did criticise the tendency to "transform into eternal laws of nature and of reason, the social forms springing from your present mode of production and form of property". For this reason, he would likely have wanted to criticise certain aspects of some accounts of human nature. Some people believe, for example, that humans are naturally selfish – Immanuel Kant and Thomas Hobbes, for example. (Both Hobbes and Kant thought that it was necessary to constrain our human nature in order to achieve a good society – Kant thought we should use rationality, Hobbes thought we should use the force of the state – Marx, as we shall see, thought that the good society was one which allows our human nature its full expression.) Most Marxists will argue that this view is an ideological illusion and the effect of commodity fetishism: the fact that people act selfishly is held to be a product of scarcity and capitalism, not an immutable human characteristic. For confirmation of this view, we can see how, in The Holy Family Marx argues that capitalists are not motivated by any essential viciousness, but by the drive toward the bare "semblance of a human existence". (Marx says "semblance" because he believes that capitalists are as alienated from their human nature under capitalism as the proletariat, even though their basic needs are better met.)

Needs and drives
In the 1844 Manuscripts the young Marx wrote:

 Man is directly a natural being. As a natural being and as a living natural being he is on the one hand endowed with natural powers, vital powers – he is an active natural being. These forces exist in him as tendencies and abilities – as instincts. On the other hand, as a natural, corporeal, sensuous objective being he is a suffering, conditioned and limited creature, like animals and plants. That is to say, the objects of his instincts exist outside him, as objects independent of him; yet these objects are objects that he needs – essential objects, indispensable to the manifestation and confirmation of his essential powers.

In the Grundrisse Marx says his nature is a "totality of needs and drives". In The German Ideology he uses the formulation: "their needs, consequently their nature". We can see then, that from Marx's early writing to his later work, he conceives of human nature as composed of "tendencies", "drives", "essential powers", and "instincts" to act in order to satisfy "needs" for external objectives. For Marx then, an explanation of human nature is an explanation of the needs of humans, together with the assertion that they will act to fulfill those needs. (c.f. The German Ideology, chapter 3). Norman Geras gives a schedule of some of the needs which Marx says are characteristic of humans:

...for other human beings, for sexual relations, for food, water, clothing, shelter, rest and, more generally, for circumstances that are conducive to health rather than disease. There is another one ... the need of people for a breadth and diversity of pursuit and hence of personal development, as Marx himself expresses these, 'all-round activity', 'all-round development of individuals', 'free development of individuals', 'the means of cultivating [one's] gifts in all directions', and so on. 

Marx says "It is true that eating, drinking, and procreating, etc., are ... genuine human functions. However, when abstracted from other aspects of human activity, and turned into final and exclusive ends, they are animal."

Productive activity, the objects of humans and actualisation

Humans as free, purposive producers
In several passages throughout his work, Marx shows how he believes humans to be essentially different from other animals. "Men can be distinguished from animals by consciousness, by religion or anything else you like. They themselves begin to distinguish themselves from animals as soon as they begin to produce their means of subsistence, a step which is conditioned by their physical organisation." In this passage from The German Ideology, Marx alludes to one difference: that humans produce their physical environments. But do not a few other animals also produce aspects of their environment as well? The previous year, Marx had already acknowledged:

It is true that animals also produce. They build nests and dwellings, like the bee, the beaver, the ant, etc. But they produce only their own immediate needs or those of their young; they produce only when immediate physical need compels them to do so, while man produces even when he is free from physical need and truly produces only in freedom from such need; they produce only themselves, while man reproduces the whole of nature; their products belong immediately to their physical bodies, while man freely confronts his own product. Animals produce only according to the standards and needs of the species to which they belong, while man is capable of producing according to the standards of every species and of applying to each object its inherent standard; hence, man also produces in accordance with the laws of beauty.

In the same work, Marx writes:

The animal is immediately one with its life activity. It is not distinct from that activity; it is that activity. Man makes his life activity itself an object of his will and consciousness. He has conscious life activity. It is not a determination with which he directly merges. Conscious life activity directly distinguishes man from animal life activity. Only because of that is he a species-being. Or, rather, he is a conscious being – i.e., his own life is an object for him, only because he is a species-being. Only because of that is his activity free activity. Estranged labour reverses the relationship so that man, just because he is a conscious being, makes his life activity, his essential being, a mere means for his existence.

Also in the segment on estranged labour:

Man is a species-being, not only because he practically and theoretically makes the species – both his own and those of other things – his object, but also – and this is simply another way of saying the same thing – because he looks upon himself as the present, living species, because he looks upon himself as a universal and therefore free being.

More than twenty years later, in Capital, he came to muse on a similar subject:

A spider conducts operations that resemble those of a weaver, and a bee puts to shame many an architect in the construction of her cells. But what distinguishes the worst architect from the best of bees is this, that the architect raises his structure in imagination before he erects it in reality. At the end of every labour-process, we get a result that already existed in the imagination of the labourer at its commencement. He not only effects a change of form in the material on which he works, but he also realises a purpose of his own that gives the law to his modus operandi, and to which he must subordinate his will. And this subordination is no mere momentary act.

From these passages we can observe something of Marx's beliefs about humans. That they characteristically produce their environments, and that they would do so, even were they not under the burden of "physical need" – indeed, they will produce the "whole of [their] nature", and may even create "in accordance with the laws of beauty". Perhaps most importantly, though, their creativity, their production is purposive and planned. Humans, then, make plans for their future activity, and attempt to exercise their production (even lives) according to them. Perhaps most importantly, and most cryptically, Marx says that humans make both their "life activity" and "species" the "object" of their will. They relate to their life activity, and are not simply identical with it. Michel Foucault's definition of biopolitics as the moment when "man begins to take itself as a conscious object of elaboration" may be compared to Marx's definition hereby exposed.

Life and the species as the objects of humans
To say that A is the object of some subject B, means that B (specified as an agent) acts upon A in some respect. Thus if "the proletariat smashes the state" then "the state" is the object of the proletariat (the subject), in respect of smashing. It is similar to saying that A is the objective of B, though A could be a whole sphere of concern and not a closely defined aim. In this context, what does it mean to say that humans make their "species" and their "lives" their "object"? It's worth noting that Marx's use of the word object can imply that these are things which humans produces, or makes, just as they might produce a material object. If this inference is correct, then those things that Marx says about human production above, also apply to the production of human life, by humans. And simultaneously, "As individuals express their life, so they are. What they are, therefore, coincides with their production, both with what they produce and with how they produce. The nature of individuals thus depends on the material conditions determining their production."

To make one's life one's object is therefore to treat one's life as something that is under one's control. To raise in imagination plans for one's future and present, and to have a stake in being able to fulfill those plans. To be able to live a life of this character is to achieve "self-activity" (actualisation), which Marx believes will only become possible after communism has replaced capitalism. "Only at this stage does self-activity coincide with material life, which corresponds to the development of individuals into complete individuals and the casting-off of all natural limitations. The transformation of labour into self-activity corresponds to the transformation of the earlier limited intercourse into the intercourse of individuals as such".

What is involved in making one's species one's object is more complicated. In one sense, it emphasises the essentially social character of humans, and their need to live in a community of the species. In others, it seems to emphasise that we attempt to make our lives expressions of our species-essence; further that we have goals concerning what becomes of the species in general. The idea covers much of the same territory as "making one's life one's object": it concerns self-consciousness, purposive activity, and so forth.

Humans as homo faber?
It is often said that Marx conceived of humans as homo faber, referring to Benjamin Franklin's definition of "man as the tool-making animal" – that is, as "man, the maker", though he never used the term himself. It is generally held that Marx's view was that productive activity is an essential human activity, and can be rewarding when pursued freely. Marx's use of the words work and labour in the section above may be unequivocally negative; but this was not always the case, and is most strongly found in his early writing. However, Marx was always clear that under capitalism, labour was something inhuman, and dehumanising. "labour is external to the worker – i.e., does not belong to his essential being; that he, therefore, does not confirm himself in his work, but denies himself, feels miserable and not happy, does not develop free mental and physical energy, but mortifies his flesh and ruins his mind". While under communism, "In the individual expression of my life I would have directly created your expression of your life, and therefore in my individual activity I would have directly confirmed and realised my true nature, my human nature, my communal nature".

Marx and race 
There are multiple examples of racism in Marx works, with adverse references to people of colour including those of Black African heritage, Indians, Slavs and Jews. For example;:

 "The Jewish n(word) Lassalle who, I'm glad to say, is leaving at the end of this week, has happily lost another 5,000 talers in an ill-judged speculation. The chap would sooner throw money down the drain than lend it to a 'friend,' even though his interest and capital were guaranteed. ... It is now quite plain to me—as the shape of his head and the way his hair grows also testify—that he is descended from the negroes who accompanied Moses' flight from Egypt (unless his mother or paternal grandmother interbred with a n(word)). Now, this blend of Jewishness and Germanness, on the one hand, and basic negroid stock, on the other, must inevitably give rise to a peculiar product. The fellow's importunity is also n(word)-like." Karl Marx, "Marx to Friedrich Engels in Manchester", 1862
 Tremaux "proved that the common Negro type is the degenerate form of a much higher one ... a very significant advance over Darwin." Karl Marx, letter to Friedrich Engels, August 7, 1866
 "Without slavery, North America, the most progressive of countries, would be transformed into a patriarchal country. Wipe out North America from the map of the world and you will have anarchy— the complete decay of modern commerce and civilization. Abolish slavery and you will have wiped America off the map of nations." Karl Marx, "The Poverty of Philosophy", 1847
 "Take Amsterdam, for instance, a city harboring many of the worst descendants of the Jews whom Ferdinand and Isabella drove out of Spain and who, after lingering a while in Portugal, were driven out of there too and eventually found a place of retreat in Holland. ... Here and there and everywhere that a little capital courts investment, there is ever one of these little Jews ready to make a little suggestion or place a little bit of a loan. The smartest highwayman in the Abruzzi is not better posted about the locale of the hard cash in a traveler's valise or pocket than these little Jews about any loose capital in the hands of a trader ... These small Jewish agents draw their supplies from the big Jewish houses ... and practice great ostensible devotion to the religion of their race." Karl Marx, "The Russian Loan", 1856
 "What is the worldly religion of the Jew? Huckstering. What is his worldly God? Money. ... Money is the jealous god of Israel, in face of which no other god may exist. Money degrades all the gods of man—and turns them into commodities. ... The bill of exchange is the real god of the Jew. His god is only an illusory bill of exchange. ... The chimerical nationality of the Jew is the nationality of the merchant, of the man of money in general." Karl Marx, "On the Jewish Question", 1844
 "This splendid territory [the Balkans] has the misfortune to be inhabited by a conglomerate of different races and nationalities, of which it is hard to say which is the least fit for progress and civilization. Slavonians, Greeks, Wallachians, Arnauts, twelve millions of men, are all held in submission by one million of Turks, and up to a recent period, it appeared doubtful whether, of all these different races, the Turks were not the most competent to hold the supremacy which, in such a mixed population, could not but accrue to one of these nationalities." Karl Marx, "The Russian Menace to Europe", 1853
 "Thus we find every tyrant backed by a Jew, as is every Pope by a Jesuit. In truth, the cravings of oppressors would be hopeless, and the practicability of war out of the question, if there were not an army of Jesuits to smother thought and a handful of Jews to ransack pockets. ... The fact that 1,855 years ago Christ drove the Jewish money-changers out of the temple, and that the money-changers of our age, enlisted on the side of tyranny, happen again to be Jews is perhaps no more than a historic coincidence." Karl Marx, "The Russian Loan", 1856
 "The expulsion of a Leper people from Egypt, at the head of whom was an Egyptian priest named Moses. Lazarus, the leper, is also the basic type of the Jew." Karl Marx, letter to Friedrich Engels, May 10, 1861
 "Abraham, Isaac and Jacob were fantasy-mongers, that the Israelites were idolators ... that the tribe of Simeon (exiled under Saul) had moved to Mecca where they built a heathenish temple and worshipped stones." Karl Marx, letter to Engels, June 16, 1864
 "Indian society has no history at all, at least no known history. What we shall call its history is but the history of the successive invaders who founded their empires on the passive basis of that unresisting and unchanging society." Karl Marx, New York Daily Tribune, August 8, 1853
 "Russia is a name usurped by the Muscovites. They are not Slavs, do not belong at all to the Indo-German race, but are des intrus [intruders], who must again be hurled back beyond the Dnieper, etc." Karl Marx, letter to Friedrich Engels, June 24, 1865

Human nature and historical materialism
Marx's theory of history attempts to describe the way in which humans change their environments and (in dialectical relation) their environments change them as well. That is:

Not only do the objective conditions change in the act of reproduction, e.g. the village becomes a town, the wilderness a cleared field etc., but the producers change, too, in that they bring out new qualities in themselves, develop themselves in production, transform themselves, develop new powers and ideas, new modes of intercourse, new needs and new language.

Further Marx sets out his "materialist conception of history" in opposition to "idealist" conceptions of history; that of Georg Wilhelm Friedrich Hegel, for instance. "The first premise of all human history is, of course, the existence of living human individuals. Thus the first fact to be established is the physical organisation of these individuals and their consequent relation to the rest of nature." Thus:History does nothing, it "possesses no immense wealth", it "wages no battles". It is man, real, living man who does all that, who possesses and fights; "history" is not, as it were, a person apart, using man as a means to achieve its own aims; history is nothing but the activity of man pursuing his aims.So we can see that, even before we begin to consider the precise character of human nature, "real, living" humans, "the activity of man pursuing his aims" is the very building block of Marx's theory of history. Humans act upon the world, changing it and themselves; and in doing so they "make history". However, even beyond this, human nature plays two key roles. In the first place, it is part of the explanation for the growth of the productive forces, which Marx conceives of as the driving force of history. Secondly, the particular needs and drives of humans explain the class antagonism which is generated under capitalism.

Human nature and the expansion of the productive forces
It has been held by several writers that it is Marx's conception of human nature which explains the "development thesis" concerning the expansion of the productive forces, which according to Marx, is itself the fundamental driving force of history. If true, this would make his account of human nature perhaps the most fundamental aspect of his work. Norman Geras wrote (italics in original): "historical materialism itself, this whole distinctive approach to society that originates with Marx, rests squarely upon the idea of a human nature." It highlights that specific nexus of universal needs and capacities which explains the human productive process and man's organized transformation of the material environment; which process and transformation it treats in turn as the basis both of the social order and of historical change.' G.A. Cohen wrote: "The tendency's autonomy is just its independence of social structure, its rootedness in fundamental material facts of human nature and the human situation." Allen Wood wrote: "Historical progress consists fundamentally in the growth of people's abilities to shape and control the world about them. This is the most basic way in which they develop and express their human essence."

In his article "Reconsidering Historical Materialism", however, Cohen gives an argument to the effect that human nature cannot be the premise on which the plausibility of the expansion of the productive forces is grounded:

Production in the historical anthropology is not identical with production in the theory of history. According to the anthropology, people flourish in the cultivation and exercise of their manifold powers, and are especially productive - which in this instance means creative - in the condition of freedom conferred by material plenty. But, in the production of interest to the theory of history, people produce not freely but because they have to, since nature does not otherwise supply their wants; and the development in history of the productive power of man (that is, of man as such, of man as a species) occurs at the expense of the creative capacity of the men who are agents and victims of that development.

The implication of this is that hence "one might ... imagine two kinds of creature, one whose essence it was to create and the other not, undergoing similarly toilsome histories because of similarly adverse circumstances. In one case, but not the other, the toil would be a self-alienating exercise of essential powers". Hence, "historical materialism and Marxist philosophical anthropology are independent of, though also consistent with, each other". The problem is this: it seems as though the motivation most people have for the work they do isn't the exercise of their creative capacity; on the contrary, labour is alienated by definition in the capitalist system based on salary, and people only do it because they have to. They go to work not to express their human nature but to find theirs means of subsistence. So in that case, why do the productive forces grow – does human nature have anything to do with it? The answer to this question is a difficult one, and a closer consideration of the arguments in the literature is necessary for a full answer than can be given in this article. However, it is worth bearing in mind that Cohen had previously been committed to the strict view that human nature (and other "asocial premises") were sufficient for the development of the productive forces – it could be that they are only one necessary constituent. It is also worth considering that by 1988, Cohen appears to have considered that the problem was resolved.

Some needs are far more important than others. In The German Ideology Marx writes that "life involves before everything else eating and drinking, a habitation, clothing and many other things". All those other aspects of human nature which he discusses (such as "self-activity") are therefore subordinate to the priority given to these. Marx makes explicit his view that humans develop new needs to replace old: "the satisfaction of the first need (the action of satisfying, and the instrument of satisfaction which has been acquired) leads to new needs".

Human nature, Marx's ethical thought and alienation
Geras said of Marx's work that: "Whatever else it is, theory and socio-historical explanation, and scientific as it may be, that work is a moral indictment resting on the conception of essential human needs, an ethical standpoint, in other words, in which a view of human nature is involved."

Alienation

Alienation, for Marx, is the estrangement of humans from aspects of their human nature. Since – as we have seen – human nature consists in a particular set of vital drives and tendencies, whose exercise constitutes flourishing, alienation is a condition wherein these drives and tendencies are stunted. For essential powers, alienation substitutes disempowerment; for making one's own life one's object, one's life becoming an object of capital. Marx believes that alienation will be a feature of all society before communism. The opposite of alienation is "actualisation" or "self-activity" – the activity of the self, controlled by and for the self.

Gerald Cohen's criticism 
One important criticism of Marx's "philosophical anthropology" (i.e. his conception of humans) is offered by Gerald Cohen, the leader of Analytical Marxism, in "Reconsidering Historical Materialism" (in Callinicos, ed., 1989). Cohen claims: "Marxist philosophical anthropology is one sided. Its conception of human nature and human good overlooks the need for self-identity than which nothing is more essentially human." (p. 173, see especially sections 6 and 7). The consequence of this is held to be that "Marx and his followers have underestimated the importance of phenomena, such as religion and nationalism, which satisfy the need for self-identity. (Section 8.)". Cohen describes what he sees as the origins of Marx's alleged neglect: "In his anti-Hegelian, Feuerbachian affirmation of the radical objectivity of matter, Marx focused on the relationship of the subject to an object which is in no way subject, and, as time went on, he came to neglect the subject's relationship to itself, and that aspect of the subject's relationship to others which is a mediated (that is, indirect), form of relationship to itself."

Cohen believes that people are driven, typically, not to create identity, but to preserve that which they have in virtue, for example, of "nationality, or race, or religion, or some slice or amalgam thereof". Cohen does not claim that "Marx denied that there is a need for self-definition, but [instead claims that] he failed to give the truth due emphasis." Nor does Cohen say that the sort of self-understanding that can be found through religion etc. is accurate. Of nationalism, he says "identifications [can] take benign, harmless, and catastrophically malignant forms" and does not believe "that the state is a good medium for the embodiment of nationality".

See also 
Antihumanism
Marx's theory of alienation
Parametric determinism

References and further reading
All the quotations from Marx in this article have used the translation employed by the Marxists Internet Archive. This means that you can follow the external reference links, and then search on that page using your browser's search function for some part of the text of the quotation in order to ascertain its context.

Primary texts
The two texts in which Marx most directly discusses human nature are the Comments on James Mill and the piece on Estranged Labour in the Economic and Philosophical Manuscripts of 1844 (published in 1932). Both of these pieces date from 1844, and as such were written by the young Marx; some analysts (Louis Althusser, etc.) assert that work from this period differs markedly in its ideas from the later work.

Accounts prior to 1978
In certain aspects, the views of many earlier writers on this topic are generally believed to have been superseded. Nevertheless, here is a selection of the best writing prior to 1978. Much of it addresses human nature through the strongly related concept of alienation:
 Erich Fromm, Marx's Concept of Man. With a Translation of Marx's Economic and Philosophical Manuscripts by T. B. Bottomore, (1961).
 Eugene Kamenka, The Ethical Foundations of Marxism (1962). The entire book can be read online.
 István Mészáros, Marx's Theory of Alienation (1970). Sections can be read online.
 Bertell Ollman, Alienation: Marx's Conception of Man in Capitalist Society (1971). Many chapters, including some directly relevant to human nature, can be read online.
 John Plamenatz, Karl Marx's Philosophy of Man, (1975).

Recent general accounts
 Marx and Human Nature: Refutation of a Legend by Norman Geras (1983) is a concise argument against the view that Marx did not believe there was something such as human nature, in particular the confusion surrounding the sixth of the Theses on Feuerbach.
  Part I provides a highly readable survey of the evidence concerning what Marx thought of human nature and his concept of alienation. See especially chapter 2. The preface to the second edition (2004) of Wood's book can be read online. The first edition was published in 1983.
 Marx and the Missing Link: Human Nature by W. Peter Archibald (1989).
 Marxism and Human Nature  by Sean Sayers (1998).
 The young Karl Marx: German philosophy, Modern politics, and human flourishing by David Leopold (2007) See Chapter 4 for close reading of Marx's 1843 texts, relating human nature to human emancipation. 
 Fellow Creatures: Our Obligations to the Other Animals by Christine M. Korsgaard (Oxford U. Press 2018) , pp. 48–50, 67, 196.

The debate over human nature and historical materialism
 Pages 150–160 (i.e. chapter 6, section 4) of G.A. Cohen's seminal Karl Marx's Theory of History (KMTH) (1978) contain an account of the relation of human nature to historical materialism. Cohen argues that the former is necessary to explain the development of the productive forces, which Marx holds to drive history.
 The view, however, was criticised by Erik Olin Wright and Andrew Levine in an article entitled Rationality and Class Struggle, first published in the New Left Review. It can be found as chapter 1 of Marxist Theory (ed. Alex Callinicos, 1989).
 It was also criticised by Joshua Cohen, in a review of KMTH in the Journal of Philosophy.
 G.A. Cohen draws out some difficulties with his own presentation in KMTH in the article "Reconsidering Historical Materialism". (First published 1983 in Marxism: NOMOS XXVI, ed. Chapman and Pennock; now available in Marxist Theory ed. Alex Callinicos, 1989; and in History, Labour, and Freedom, G.A. Cohen, 1988). The article's contentions (for a five-point summary, see Callinicos pp. 173–4) concern the connection of Marx's historical materialism to his "philosophical anthropology" – basically, his conception of human nature.
 Chapter 5 of G.A. Cohen's History, Labour and Freedom (1988) is entitled Human Nature and Social Change in the Marxist Conception of History and is co-authored by Cohen and Will Kymlicka. (First published 1988 in the Journal of Philosophy.) The purpose of the chapter is to defend Cohen's contention in his KMTH that there is an autonomous tendency of the productive forces to develop, where "autonomous" means "independent of particular social relations". The text is a response to the criticisms of J. Cohen, Levine and Wright. That is, G.A. Cohen and Kymlicka seek to show that there are no grounds for an a priori denial' of the claim that "extra-social features of human nature and the human situation operate powerfully enough to generate an historical tendency capable of overcoming recaltricant social structures" (p. 106). There may be thought to be a tension between the claims of this article and those of "Reconsidering Historical Materialism".

Footnotes 

Marxist theory
Philosophical anthropology
Philosophical theories